Alfred Dregger  (10 December 1920 – 29 June 2002) was a German politician and a leader of the Christian Democratic Union (CDU).

Dregger was born in Münster. After graduating from a school in Werl, he entered the German Wehrmacht in 1939. He was wounded four times and served until the end of the war, when he commanded a battalion on the Eastern Front at the rank of Captain. In 1946, he began studying law and government at the universities of Marburg and Tübingen, earning his doctorate in 1950.

Dregger served from 1956 to 1970 as Oberbürgermeister or mayor of Fulda; when first elected, he was the youngest mayor in West Germany. He also served from 1962 to 1972 as a member of the Landtag of Hesse. He was for a time leader of the CDU in that body, and, in 1967, became state party chairman, an office which he held until 1982. In 1969 he was also elected as a member of the national board of the party. From 1972 1998 he was a representative in the German Bundestag; from 1982 to 1991 he was Chairman of the CDU/CSU group there.

Dregger was known as a staunch conservative and was a prominent member of the so-called Stahlhelm-Fraktion, a National-Conservative wing of the CDU.

In the 1970s he was an outspoken proponent of outlawing the German Communist Party. He was responsible for the slogan "Freiheit statt Sozialismus" (Freedom instead of Socialism) with which the CDU had great success in the 1976 elections. In his eulogy, CDU/CSU parliamentary group leader Friedrich Merz said of him, "Few have so clearly and categorically opposed the Left for decades". He called for Germany to "come out of Hitler's shadow".

He resisted criticism of the Wehrmacht, strongly opposing a travelling exhibition called Die Verbrechen der Wehrmacht 1941 - 1944 (The Crimes of the Wehrmacht, 1941–1944) and writing to United States Senators that if they discouraged Ronald Reagan from his presidential visit to the Bitburg military cemetery, he would "consider this to be an insult to my brother and my comrades who were killed in action." He saw himself as a defender of Germany and the last representative of the war generation in the Bundestag.

Family
Alfred Dregger was married and had two sons; his elder son was killed in an accident in 1972.

References

Sources
 Michael Schwab. Alfred Dregger für Fulda und Deutschland: Stationen eines charismatischen Politikers. Fulda informiert: Dokumentationen zur Stadtgeschichte 26. Petersberg: Imhof, 2008. .

External links

1920 births
2002 deaths
People from Münster
University of Tübingen alumni
Members of the Bundestag for Hesse
Alterspräsidents of the Bundestag
Grand Crosses 1st class of the Order of Merit of the Federal Republic of Germany
Members of the Bundestag 1994–1998
Members of the Bundestag 1990–1994
Members of the Bundestag 1987–1990
Members of the Bundestag 1983–1987
Members of the Bundestag 1980–1983
Members of the Bundestag 1976–1980
Members of the Bundestag 1972–1976
Members of the Bundestag for the Christian Democratic Union of Germany
Members of the Landtag of Hesse
Nazi Party members
German Army officers of World War II
Military personnel from Münster